USS Henry County (IX-34), an unclassified miscellaneous vessel, was the first ship of the United States Navy to be named for Henry County, which exists in Alabama, Georgia, Illinois, Indiana, Iowa, Kentucky, Ohio, Tennessee, and Virginia.

Her keel was laid down by the American Ship Building Company, in Cleveland, Ohio. 
She was transferred to the Navy on 24 May 1930 so the Navy could loan her to the State of California to serve as a training vessel for the newly formed California Nautical School (later California Maritime Academy). She was commissioned at Portsmouth, Virginia, on 27 May 1930 with Commander Benjamin Vaughan McCandlish in command.

Henry County sailed for the West Coast on 12 July, transiting the Panama Canal on 23 July and arriving in San Diego, California, via Corinto, Nicaragua, on 13 August.  She decommissioned at Mare Island, California, on 22 August 1930 and was loaned to the State of California that same day. She was renamed California State on 23 January 1931. California State was stricken from the Navy List on 11 April 1940, and the transfer to the Maritime Commission was completed on 30 June 1940.

California State was renamed Golden State in 1941 under a Maritime Commission policy, which renamed the training ships to their states' nicknames. She was returned to the reserve fleet on 13 August 1946, and her successor, T/S Golden Bear was commissioned on 7 September 1946. The ex-Golden State was sold to John E. Tsavaris and operated under a U.S. flag as Isle of Patmos starting in November 1947. She was renamed to Santa Rosa and sailed under a Brazilian flag until she was scrapped in August 1962.

References

External links

 
 
 

Unclassified miscellaneous vessels of the United States Navy
Henry County, Alabama
Henry County, Georgia
Henry County, Illinois
Henry County, Indiana
Henry County, Iowa
Henry County, Kentucky
Henry County, Ohio
Henry County, Tennessee
Henry County, Virginia
Ships built in Cleveland
1930 ships